Lerhupur is a census town in Varanasi tehsil of Varanasi district in the Indian state of Uttar Pradesh. The census town &  village falls under the Ladhupur gram panchayat. Lerhupur Census town & village is  about 8 kilometers North-West of Varanasi railway station, 305 kilometers South-East of Lucknow and 17 kilometers  North-West of Banaras Hindu University.

Demography
Ledhupur  has  families with a total population  of 6,934. Sex ratio of the census town & village is  876 and child sex ratio is 902. Uttar Pradesh state average for both  ratios is 912 and 902 respectively .

Transportation
Lerhupur  is connected by air (Lal Bahadur Shastri Airport), by train (Varanasi railway station) and by road. Nearest  operational airports is Lal Bahadur Shastri Airport and nearest  operational railway station is Varanasi railway station (25 and 8 kilometers respectively from Lerhupur).

See also
 Varanasi Cantt.
 Varanasi (Lok Sabha constituency)

Notes

  All  demographic data is based on 2011 Census of India.

References 

Census towns in Varanasi district
Cities and towns in Varanasi district